Harsefeld is a Samtgemeinde ("collective municipality") in the district of Stade, in Lower Saxony, Germany. Its seat is in the village Harsefeld.

The Samtgemeinde Harsefeld consists of the following municipalities:
Ahlerstedt 
Bargstedt 
Brest 
Harsefeld

Samtgemeinden in Lower Saxony